Dr. Panjabrao Deshmukh Krishi Vidyapeeth (PDKV or PKV) is an agricultural university located at Akola, in Maharashtra, India, in the Vidarbha region. The university is entrusted with the responsibility of agricultural education, research and extension education along with breeder and foundation seed programmes.

Its jurisdiction includes all eleven districts of Vidarbha namely Akola, Amravati, Bhandara, Buldhana, Chandrapur, Gadchiroli, Gondia, Nagpur, Washim, Wardha and Yavatmal.

The Central Campus is at Akola while another major campus is at Nagpur. A new campus has been established at Garchiroli.

History 
In the mid-1960s, Maharashtra government decided to establish agricultural universities. One such location was at Akola in Vidarbha, where there was already a functioning agriculture college since 1905. 
However, leaders from Western Maharashtra prevailed on the Maharashtra government to shift it Rahuri in Western Maharashtra. As a result, Government of Maharashtra shifted the State Agril. University to Rahuri in Western Maharashtra by end of 1966.

This led to an unprecedented student protest in Akola, and provoked an angry response from citizens of Vidarbha, who viewed it as one more act of discrimination against them. It may be remembered that on 1 November 1956, a part of Madhya Pradesh consisting of eight districts of Vidarbha had been merged against the local people's wishes and the recommendations of the States Reorganisation Commission into the erstwhile State of Bombay, which was later transformed in the State of Maharashtra on 1 May 1960. The people of Vidarbha resented this merger, and saw the shifting of the Agriculture University from Akola to Rahuri as an act of deliberate discrimination and favouritism.

On 17 August 1967 in Akola, thousands of people demonstrated against this government's decision finally resulting in of the massive violent agitation of the Students in which 9 students were shot dead by the police.

The agitation ended after the government of Maharashtra relented not to shift the Agricultural University to Rahuri. The agitation also marked the beginning of Jambuvantrao Dhote's period in Vidarbha's statehood struggle.

Finally the Agricultural University at Akola was started on 20 October 1969. It was named after the illustrious son of Vidarbha Dr. Panjabrao (alias Bhausaheb) Deshmukh, who was the Minister for Agriculture, Government of India, as Panjabrao Krishi Vidyapeeth. It was renamed as Dr. Panjabrao Deshmukh Krishi Vidyapeeth from 15 November 1995.

College of Agriculture, Nagpur located in heartland of the city is one of the 5 oldest Agriculture colleges that started in 1905.

Research 
The university has over a total 3425 hectares of cultivable land under its possession for conducting various research, field trials in addition to seed multiplication programme. This university covers the need of a wide range of climatic zones varying from Wet Humid Rice zone of East gradually ending with Arid Cotton and Millet Zone of west. Similarly its northern districts form southern limit for wheat cultivation in India.  In the past this university has made significant contribution to research work especially in cotton (PKV-2 cotton hybrid), sorghum (kharif hybrids), pulses (TAU- series of Black gram), oilseed (TAG-24 Groundnut variety; few linseed varieties), watershed management, dryland management, and Mandarin orange cultivation.

20 research stations
24 all India co-ordinated projects
16 ad-hoc schemes under operation
28 non-plan and 2 plan research projects
Biotechnology Centre
Nagarjuna Medicinal and Aromatic Plant Park
Biodiversity Park
Maharajbagh Zoo

Agricultural research stations

 Central Research Station: Akola
 Central Trial Campus, Vani Rambhapur, Akola
 National Agril Res. Project, Yavatmal
 National Agril Res. Project, Sindewahi, District Chandrapur; Paddy Research Station
 Kharif Cereal and Pulse Research and Training Project: Mhali, Amgaon Dist- Gondia
 Regional Research Centre, Amravati
 Agri. Research Station, Sonapur Dist. Gadchircoli
 Agri. Research Station, Washim
 Agri. Research Station, Achalpur Dist- Amravati
 Agri. Research Station, Buldana
 Agri. College Campus, Nagpur
 Regional Fruit Research Station Katol Dist Nagpur
 Agri. Research Station, Tharsa Dist. Nagpur
 Agri. Research Station, Sakoli
 Agril Research Station, NavegaonBan Dist-Bhandara
 Agril Research Station, Patur Road, Akola
 Betelwine Research Station, Ramtek
 Agril Research Station, Kutki, tal-hinganghat, Dist-Wardha
 Agril Research Station, Ekarjuna Dist. Chandrapur
 Betelwine Research Station: Akot Dist. Akola

Academics 
PDKV grants bachelor's, master's and doctoral degrees in Agricultural Sciences and Agricultural Engineering & Technology. Admission to all the degree, postgraduate and doctorate degree programmes are made through MCAER, Pune. New College of Agriculture has been opened at Gadchiroli, a tribal district. There are also five agriculture schools for lower education located at Buldana, Hiwara, Mul-Maroda, Nimbi, Sawangi and Warud.

Recently under the grant of Dr. Panjabrao Deshmukh Krushi Vidhyapeeth running new college Vasantrao Naik College of Agriculture and Biotechnology, at Yavatmal.

Departments
Dr. Panjabrao Deshmukh Agriculture University has several departments with its intent to provide the best current knowledge needed by farmers. The university is always trying to provide highly reputed education, research and extension with the departments.

 Agronomy
 Agriculture Entomology
 Agriculture Botany (Genetics and plant Breeding, Crops Physiology, Seeds Technology, Agriculture Biotechnology)
 Soil Science
 Agriculture Economics and statistic
 Extension Education 
 Agricultural Engineering
 Animal husbandry and Dairy science
 Plant Pathology

Student welfare 
The director of student welfare looks after the following activities for the welfare of students.
 To promote and develop various sports, game and co-curricular activities amongst students at the university level
 To promote the sportsman spirit and to organize inter College tournament within the jurisdiction of the university.
 To conduct inter university tournaments behalf of the inter University Sports Board, New Delhi/Inter Agriculture University Sports Board /Inter State University Tournament (Ashwamegh).
 To organize campus interviews of the different firms, industries, seed and pesticides companies, banks, etc. for the placement of students.

The university has established the Dr. Panjabrao Deshmukh Competitive Forum (Dr. PDCF) to extend the facilities to the students for guidance and preparation of different competitive examination.

Extension education 
Imparting of extension education is one of the mandatory functions of the university. The university has 11 Krishi Vigyan Kendras (KVK), which undertake training and demonstrations for the benefit of farmers. It also has a Training and Visit Scheme (T&V) at Nagpur, Sindewahi and Yavatmal.

The Directorate of Extension Education of the university has been recognized by the Ministry of Agriculture, Govt. of India, as the Center of Excellence for imparting training on Dryland Agriculture Technology.

Institution Village Linkage Program (IVLP): The pilot project on technology assessment and refinement through IVLP sponsored by ICAR,New Delhi is being implemented by the university in the village Gorwha, Taluka Barshitakli, District Akola, since 1995.

Vice Chancellor
Dr.S. R. Gadakh (a distinguished agronomist) has been appointed as the Vice Chancellor (VC) of this university in September 2022 for a term of five years.

Former Vice Chancellors, in chronological order, are as given below:

Previous Vice Chancellors
 Late L.N. Bongirwar (1-7-1969 to 9-10-1972), the first Vice Chancellor
 Late N. Gopalkrishna (10-10-1972 to 1-6-1978) specialization in Horticulture; Previously Horticulturist to the Government of Bombay 
 D.N. Kapoor (2-6-1978 to 2-7-1978)additional charge
 Late B.A. Chougule (3-7-1978 to 15-4-1981); specialization in the field of Agricultural Chemistry
 S.P. Upasani (16-4-1981 to 10-6-1981) additional charge
 V.S. Gopalkrishna (11-6-1981 to 13-8-1981)additional charge
 S. Rama Krishna (14-8-1981 to 12-2-1982)additional charge
 K.R. Thakare (13-2-1981 to 15-12-1985); specialization in Entomology
 V.T. Rahate (16-12-1985 to 15-6-1986) additional charge
 Late H.B. Ulemale (16-6–1986 to 30-4-1990); specialization in Agricultural Economics
 Late P.W. Amin (1-5-1990 to 30-4–1993) (expired 2006); specialization in Entomology. Earlier worked at ICRISAT.
 B.G. Bhatkal (1-5-1993 to 30-4–1996); specialization in the field of Agronomy
 G.M. Bharad (1-5-1996 to 16-5–1999); specialization in the field of Watershed Management
 M.L. Madan (17-5-1999 to 16-5–2002); specialization in the field of Animal Husbandry 
 S.A. Nimbalkar (17-5-2002 to 3-7–2007); specialization in the field of Entomology
 V.M. Mayande (4-7-2007 to 3-7-2012); specialization in the field of Agril. Engineering
 R.G. Dani (14-08-2012 to 29-07-2017); specialization in the field of Genetics
 Vilas Bhale (23-09-2017 to 08-09-2022); specialization in the field of Agronomy
 Dileep Malkhede (09-09-2022 to 15-09-2022); Additional Charge, Vice Chanceller of Sant Gadge Baba Amravati University, Amravati
 Shrad Gadakh (16-09-2022 to Present)

See also
Maharajbagh zoo

Controversies 

Dadaji Ramaji Khobragade accused the state-run Punjabrao Krishi Vidyapeeth (PKV) for taking credit for the brand that he had originally bred on his farm and given to the university scientists. The PKV held that sourced it from him and significantly improved the variety with their scientific inputs. The issue remains unresolved till date. Recently  there have been controversies regarding selection of staff. These were investigated and found correct as per recommendations of Justice Dhabe commission and the Ganesh Thakur committee. As per their recommendations a few staff members were removed or placed back to their original positions.

References

External links 
 https://www.pdkv.ac.in/Admin/pdf/kulguruchargehandover-050922.pdf 
 

Agricultural universities and colleges in Maharashtra
Education in Akola
Forestry education in India
Educational institutions established in 1969
1969 establishments in Maharashtra